The Thomas Edison Center at Menlo Park, also known as the Menlo Park Museum / Edison Memorial Tower,  is a memorial to inventor and businessman Thomas Alva Edison, located in the Menlo Park area of Edison, Middlesex County, New Jersey. The tower was dedicated on February 11, 1938, on what would have been the inventor's 91st birthday.

The tower marks the location of Edison's Menlo Park laboratory, the world's first organized research and development site. He came to Menlo Park in 1876. The area was then known as Raritan Township, and later changed (in 1954) to Edison Township. Menlo Park is known as the Birthplace of Recorded Sound (November 1877), and the site of the world's first practical incandescent lamp-light bulb (October 1879).  Edison and his staff would create 400 of his most important inventions here.  It was this site that Edison would fondly nickname his 'Invention Factory'.  Edison and his staff were working in New York City, building the world's first central distribution site for electricity, when his wife Mary Stilwell Edison died at their Menlo Park home.   He would later relocate to West Orange, New Jersey in 1884 to what is now the Thomas Edison National Historical Park.  The original Menlo Park buildings began to deteriorate, and by 1926 most of the buildings had either collapsed or burned, and the only two remaining buildings were later moved to Greenfield Village in Dearborn, Michigan. The Thomas A. Edison Memorial Tower was added to the National Register of Historic Places on November 30, 1979 as an important architectural and commemorative landmark.

The tower's pinnacle is meant to represent an incandescent light bulb and originally included an audio system that according to a 2004 Weird NJ magazine could be heard from a distance of two miles. The American concrete pioneer John Joseph Earley was involved in its construction. The Tower, which rises 131 feet above the Terrace, is topped by a 13' 8" foot high Bulb made of Pyrex segments by the Corning Corporation.  The tower is listed on the New Jersey and National Registers of Historic Places, and is now being restored, a project managed by The State of New Jersey.

The museum showcases many of Thomas Edison's creations including the phonograph and many of his light bulbs, as well as memorabilia relating to Edison and his inventions. The museum also showcases many images taken of Edison's property, inventions, and family.

The remainder of Edison's  estate is now the Edison State Park.

The Thomas Edison Center at Menlo Park is jointly administered by the New Jersey Department of Environmental Protection's Division of Parks and Forestry, the Township of Edison, and the non-profit Edison Memorial Tower Corporation.

The Edison Memorial Tower Corporation, a 501(c)3, has been instrumental in having the current museum renovated.  The renovated museum reopened on June 9, 2012, with old and newly acquired artifacts. The new professional interpretative exhibits were designed by Daniel Schnur.

Restoration
The tower underwent restoration from 2011-2015. Concrete samples were taken off the facade and sent to a laboratory where they were tested for their specific makeup. This is so the recreated panels could match the old ones that do not need replacing.

The Centennial Plaque, which was stolen a number of years ago, was also replaced during the restoration. The lower part of the plaque was sent to a Metallurgist in order to match the color.

The restoration was completed in October 2015, and a re-dedication ceremony was held on October 24, 2015. The ceremony showed off the newly refurbished tower, media system which played music from the tower's construction until the 50s, grounds, and will conclude with the relighting of the large light bulb at the top of the tower.

Also to note there have been a few Eagle Scout projects in the area. One is the large informational sign across Christie Street from the tower. This project contains information about the Electric Railroad Edison built in that spot. The second project is the sign at the bottom edge of the property, closest to Route 27. The newest project was completed on June 8, 2013, and is a sign closer to the museum. The sign contains information about the museum, the website, and hours of operation.

World's second largest light bulb
The sphere atop the tower had been called the "world's largest light bulb", however, in 2021, a larger light bulb, 17’ tall and 10’ in diameter, was installed in Tulsa, Oklahoma, on the plaza in front of the Cox Business Convention Center. Another famous sphere, the Union Watersphere, lon-known as the "world's tallest water sphere" is located in nearby Union.

See also

National Register of Historic Places listings in Middlesex County, New Jersey

References

External links
Thomas Alva Edison Memorial Tower and Museum
 Article on tower preservation efforts
Edison Tower to receive $1.8 million for repairs, Edison Metuchen Sentinel, September 13, 2006.
Edison Tower renovations begin; fundraising continues, Edison Metuchen Sentinel, June 20, 2007.
Overhead view of Tower, Overhead view of Tower.

Edison, New Jersey
Infrastructure completed in 1938
Museums established in 1938
Monuments and memorials on the National Register of Historic Places in New Jersey
Museums in Middlesex County, New Jersey
Tourist attractions in Middlesex County, New Jersey
Edison Memorial Tower
Buildings and structures in Middlesex County, New Jersey
Towers in New Jersey
1938 sculptures
Concrete sculptures in New Jersey
Edison
Science museums in New Jersey
History museums in New Jersey
National Register of Historic Places in Middlesex County, New Jersey
New Jersey Register of Historic Places
1938 establishments in New Jersey